is a Japanese photographer, known for exploring male sexuality.

Biography 
Eiki Mori was born in Kanazawa, Japan in 1976. Mori graduated from the photography department of Parsons The New School for Design in New York City. In 2011, Mori launched OSSU - the first Japanese magazine to explore male sexuality. He won the 39th Kimura Ihei Award in 2014 for "intimacy" portraits. Eiki Mori lives and works in Tokyo.

Exhibitions

Solo
 1998 "Symphonic Flowers", Gallery 888, Kanazawa
 2006 "A Perfect Morning", Punctum, Tokyo
 2010 "You See Rainbows" Kaori-za, Tokyo 
 2011 "tokyo boy alone" good cho's, mezamashikohi urban, Wombbloc Arts, Taiwan
 2012 "tokyo boy alone / intimacy" Monash University Prato Centre, Italy
 2013 "intimacy" Zen Foto Gallery, Tokyo 
 2013 "intimacy" chef d'oeuvre, Osaka
 2014 "intimacy" IMA Books Gallery, Tokyo
 2014 "The 39th Kimura Ihei Award Exhibition intimacy" Konica Minolta Plaza Gallery C, Tokyo
 2014 "The 39th Kimura Ihei Award Exhibition intimacy" Kapo Gallery, Kanazawa

Group
 2009 "I see you" Ithaca Public Art Gallery, Ithaca, Greece
 2009 "I see you" Melina Cultural Center, Athens, Greece
 2010 "Brand New Valentine" Mitsubishi-Jisho Artium, Fukuoka
 2010 "Boy BANG Boy" East Gallery, London, UK
 2011 "Homage to Pier Paolo Pasolini" Vanilla Gallery, Tokyo
 2011 "Obscurite et Lumiere" Impossible Project Space Tokyo, Tokyo
 2011 "POLAROID (IM)POSSIBLE - The Westlicht collection" WestLicht Photo Museum, Wien, Austria
 2011 "boy's little worlds" Zen Foto Gallery, Tokyo
 2011 "cum" VZ Gallery, London, UK
 2012 "triple fantasy" Art Print Gallery, Tokyo
 2012 "triple fantasy" NEW ACCIDENT, Kanazawa
 2012 "triple fantasy" WHAT A VIEW mimi space, Taipei, Taiwan
 2012 "The Polaroid Collection" NRW-Forum, Duesseldorf, Germany
 2013 "FUORI POSTO(OUT OF PLACE)" Casa Masaccio Arte Contemporanea, San Giovanni Valdarno, Italy
 2013 "edition.nord_exhibition_RE/source" space_inframince, Osaka
 2014 "Absorption and Explosion" Videotage, Hong Kong, China
 2015 "Wedding Politics" chef d'oeuvre, Osaka 
 2015 "Kimura Ihei Award 40th Anniversary Exhibition" The Kawasaki City Museum, Kanagawa
 2016 "Fashioning Identity" Gallery Fleur - Kyoto Seika University, Kyoto

Bibliography

References

External links
OSSU magazine
Intimacy on Vimeo

1976 births
Living people
Japanese photographers
Japanese gay artists
Japanese LGBT photographers
Gay photographers
Parsons School of Design alumni
People from Kanazawa, Ishikawa
People from Tokyo